

Results

Green denotes finalists

References

Women's 3 metre springboard
Euro